Dr. A. H. Allen Cottage is a historic cure cottage located at Saranac Lake in Franklin County, New York.  It was built in 1909 and is a two-story wood-frame structure clad in cedar shingles.  It is a rectangular structure with a gabled roof, large shed roof dormer on the north end of the house, and non intersecting gables on the south end on both sides.  It features a verandah and sleeping porch.

It was listed on the National Register of Historic Places in 1992.

References

Houses on the National Register of Historic Places in New York (state)
Houses completed in 1909
Houses in Franklin County, New York
American Craftsman architecture in New York (state)
National Register of Historic Places in Franklin County, New York
Saranac Lake, New York